Dhananjay Singh is an Indian politician who served as the MLA for Rari constituency, Jaunpur district in the Uttar Pradesh Legislative Assembly from 2002 to 2009 as an independent candidate. He was Member of Parliament (MP) in the 15th Lok Sabha from 2009 to 2014 as a Bahujan Samaj Party (BSP) member. 

Dhananjay Singh has drawn scrutiny for his alleged corruption and involvement in many cases, and has been described as a Purvanchal Bahubali politician and Mafia Don.

Early life and career 
Dhananjay Singh was born in Jaunpur on 16 July 1975 in a Rajput family. According to the Lok Sabha, he is also involved in business and farming. In the late 1990s, he studied at Lucknow University and graduated with a master's in political science, and also started gaining notoriety around this time for his involvement in gang activity. Between 1996 and 2013, Singh had been charged four times under the Gangster Act.

Personal life 
Singh married his first wife, Meenu, on 12 December 2006. She died ten months later on 12 September 2007. Family members claimed that she committed suicide. He married his second wife, Dr. Jagriti Singh, on 29 June 2009. After mutual disagreement, they separated and he married his third wife, Srikala Reddy, a BJP politician, in 2017.

References 

Living people
Bahujan Samaj Party politicians from Uttar Pradesh
1975 births